Parliamentary elections were held in the Free City of Danzig on 16 November 1930. The Social Democratic Party emerged as the largest party, receiving 25% of the vote and winning 19 of the 72 seats in the Volkstag. Voter turnout was 89%.

Results

References

Elections in the Free City of Danzig
Danzig
November 1930 events